Magne Havnå (16 September 1963 – 29 May 2004) was a Norwegian professional boxer who once held the WBO world title in cruiserweight, beating Boone Pultz (USA) in 5 rounds in May 1990. His son Kai Robin Havnaa is also a boxer in the cruiserweight division, currently undefeated as a professional.

Amateur career
Club: Sentrum BK, Oslo, under legendary trainer Leif Hvalby, who was amateur champion and a sparring partner for the Danish EBU champion Christian Christensen in the 1950s and '60s.
1981 Scandavian Junior Amateur heavyweight champion
1984 Norwegian heavyweight champion
Represented Norway as a Heavyweight at 1984 Los Angeles Olympic Games.
Lost to Haakan Brock (Sweden) KO by 3
1985 Norwegian heavyweight champion
1986 Norwegian heavyweight champion

Professional career
After boxing in the 1984 Summer Olympics, Havnå turned pro in 1986. During his career, Havnå had 22 professional fights with 19 wins. His first fight was a 4-round decision over the UK's Johnny Nelson, who later on also became a world champion.

Professional boxing record

Death
Havnå died in May 2004 in Lindgrov, Risør, Aust-Agder in a boat accident at the age of 40. Magne Havnå's brother Erling Havnå is one of the men convicted for participating in the NOKAS bank robbery of 2004.

See also
List of world cruiserweight boxing champions

References

External links

sports-reference
 

 

1963 births
2004 deaths
Norwegian male boxers
Boxers at the 1984 Summer Olympics
Olympic boxers of Norway
Boating accident deaths
Accidental deaths in Norway
People from Risør
Cruiserweight boxers
World cruiserweight boxing champions
World Boxing Organization champions
Sportspeople from Agder